The SuperLega Credem Banca 2022–23 is the 78th season of the highest tier domestic division in the Italian Men's Volleyball League system since establishment in 1946. The league organized under the supervision of Federazione Italiana Pallavolo. The season started on 1 October 2022.

Conad Reggio Emilia was supposed to be promoted to SuperLega after winning the 2021–22 Serie A2 but their home arena failed to meet the standard of SuperLega. Hence, Emma Villas Aubay Siena was promoted to SuperLega instead.

Format
The Lega Pallavolo SuperLega Credem Banca is Italy's top men's league. Twelve clubs participated in the 2022–23 league, which is split into two phases.

Regular season
The first phase, also known as the Regular Season, runs from October 2022 to March 2023 and features two legs, with each club playing in a double round robin system with home-and-away fixtures. The bottom ranked team relegated to Serie A2 next season.

Playoffs
5th place
At the end of the regular season, the ranked 9th–11th teams play in a double round robin system. The quarterfinals loser teams and the winner of 5th place preliminaries play in a round robin system with top 4 teams qualified to semifinals. Semifinals and finals play in a single elimination system.

Championship
At the end of the regular season, the top eight teams directly advance to the quarterfinals in the Championship play–offs with the classic pairing system (1st vs 8th, 2nd vs 7th, 3rd vs 6th and 4th vs 5th). Quarterfinals, semifinals, 3rd place match and final will play in a best-of-five series. The top three teams in the final standing as per the Teams Ranking System (including result of the regular season) qualified for the 2023–24 CEV Champions League while 4th place team qualified for the 2023–24 CEV Cup and 5th place team qualified for the 2023–24 CEV Challenge Cup.

Teams

Squads
In the current season rules, Each teams involved in the tournament were required to register 14-player roster must be selected in each match. There's no limit of foreign players in the each team’s roster but it must have at least 2 Italian players on the court at all times.

Transfer players

Pool standing procedure
 Highest number of result points, the teams will be ranked by the most point gained per match as follows:
 Match won 3–0 or 3–1: 3 points for the winner, 0 points for the loser
 Match won 3–2: 2 points for the winner, 1 point for the loser
 Match forfeited: 3 points for the winner, 0 points (0–25, 0–25, 0–25) for the loser
 In the event of a tie, the following first tiebreaker will apply: total number of victories (matches won, matches lost)
 If teams are still tied after examining the most point gained and the number of victories, then will examine the results in order to break the tie in the following order:
 Set quotient: if two or more teams are tied on the number of points gained, they will be ranked by the quotient resulting from the division of the number of all set won by the number of all sets lost.
 Points quotient: if the tie persists based on the set quotient, the teams will be ranked by the quotient resulting from the division of all points scored by the total of points lost during all sets.
 If the tie persists based on the point quotient, the tie will be broken based on the team that won the match of the Round Robin Phase between the tied teams. When the tie in point quotient is between three or more teams, these teams ranked taking into consideration only the matches involving the teams in question.

Super Cup

Super Cup is the pre-season tournament, featuring the first title of Season 2022–23. 

Sir Safety Susa Perugia won Super Cup and grabbed their first title of this season by defeating Cucine Lube Civitanova in a tie-break match.

Regular season
 All times are local, CEST (UTC+02:00) between 1 and 29 October 2022 and CET (UTC+01:00) from 30 October 2022.

League table

Results table

Fixtures and results

Leg 1
|-
!colspan=12|Matchday 1
|-

|-
!colspan=12|Matchday 2
|-

|-
!colspan=12|Matchday 3
|-

|-
!colspan=12|Matchday 4
|-

|-
!colspan=12|Matchday 5
|-

|-
!colspan=12|Matchday 6
|-

|-
!colspan=12|Matchday 7
|-

|-
!colspan=12|Matchday 8
|-

|-
!colspan=12|Matchday 9
|-

|-
!colspan=12|Matchday 10
|-

|-
!colspan=12|Matchday 11
|-

|}

Leg 2
|-
!colspan=12|Matchday 12
|-

|-
!colspan=12|Matchday 13
|-

|-
!colspan=12|Matchday 14
|-

|-
!colspan=12|Matchday 15
|-

|-
!colspan=12|Matchday 16
|-

|-
!colspan=12|Matchday 17
|-

|-
!colspan=12|Matchday 18
|-

|-
!colspan=12|Matchday 19
|-

|-
!colspan=12|Matchday 20
|-

|-
!colspan=12|Matchday 21
|-

|-
!colspan=12|Matchday 22
|-

|}

Italian Cup

Italian Cup is the middle-season tournament, featuring the top eight teams from Leg 1 to champion the traditional title. Gas Sales Bluenergy Piacenza won the title for the first time beating Itas Trentino 3-0 in straight sets.

5th place play-offs
 All times are local, Central European Summer Time (UTC+2:00).

Preliminary round

League and results table

Fixtures and results
|-
!colspan=12|Matchday 1
|-

|-
!colspan=12|Matchday 2
|-

|-
!colspan=12|Matchday 3
|-

|-
!colspan=12|Matchday 4
|-

|-
!colspan=12|Matchday 5
|-

|-
!colspan=12|Matchday 6
|-

|}

Group round

League and results table

Fixtures and results

|-
!colspan=12|Matchday 1
|-

|-
!colspan=12|Matchday 2
|-

|-
!colspan=12|Matchday 3
|-

|-
!colspan=12|Matchday 4
|-

|-
!colspan=12|Matchday 5
|-

|}

Final round

Bracket

Semifinals

|}

Final

|}

Championship play–offs
 All times are local, Central European Summer Time (UTC+2:00).

Results table

 

 

 

Legend: Blue = home team win; Red = away team win.

Bracket

Quarterfinals
|-
!colspan=12|(1) Sir Safety Susa Perugia vs. (8) Allianz Milano
|-

|-
!colspan=12|(2) Itas Trentino vs. (7) Vero Volley Monza
|-

|-
!colspan=12|(3) Valsa Group Modena vs. (6) Gas Sales Bluenergy Piacenza
|-

|-
!colspan=12|(4) Cucine Lube Civitanova vs. (5) WithU Verona
|-

|}

Semifinals
|-
!colspan=12|() vs. 
|-

|-
!colspan=12|() vs. 
|-

|}

3rd place match
|}

Final
|}

Final standings

Awards

MVP of the month
 Credem Banca MVP of October:  Matey Kaziyski (Itas Trentino)
 Credem Banca MVP of November:  Adis Lagumdzija (Valsa Group Modena)
 Credem Banca MVP of December:  Yoandy Leal (Gas Sales Bluenergy Piacenza)
 Credem Banca MVP of January:  Wilfredo Leon (Sir Safety Susa Perugia)
 Credem Banca MVP of February:  Luca Spirito (WithU Verona)

Awards of the Season

Most Valuable Player
Best coach
Best U–23 Player
Best Scorer
Best Receiver

Best Server
Best Spiker
Best Middle Blocker
Best Blocker

See also
2022–23 CEV Champions League
2022–23 CEV Cup

References

External links
  
  

Men's volleyball competitions in Italy
2022 in men's volleyball
2023 in men's volleyball
2022 in Italian sport
2023 in Italian sport
2022–23 in European volleyball leagues
Current volleyball seasons
Volleyball competitions in Italy